Nuno Borges and Francisco Cabral defeated Máximo González and André Göransson in the final, 6–2, 6–3 to win the doubles tennis title at the 2022 Estoril Open. Borges and Cabral had entered the tournament through a wildcard.

Hugo Nys and Tim Pütz were the defending champions, but only Nys chose to play, partnering Jan Zieliński; they lost in the first round to Raven Klaasen and Ben McLachlan.

Seeds

Draw

Draw

References

External links
 Main draw

Estoril Open - Doubles
Doubles